Chloroselas arabica is a butterfly in the family Lycaenidae. It is found in Yemen and Somaliland.

References

Butterflies described in 1932
Chloroselas